Ciarrocchi is an Italian surname. Notable people with the surname include:

Alessandro Ciarrocchi (born 1988), Swiss footballer
Pat Ciarrocchi (born 1952), American television journalist
Ray Ciarrocchi, American painter

Italian-language surnames